16S rRNA (guanine527-N7)-methyltransferase (ribosomal RNA small subunit methyltransferase G, 16S rRNA methyltransferase RsmG, GidB, rsmG (gene)) is an enzyme with systematic name S-adenosyl-L-methionine:16S rRNA (guanine527-N7)-methyltransferase. This enzyme catalyses the following chemical reaction

 S-adenosyl-L-methionine + guanine527 in 16S rRNA  S-adenosyl-L-homocysteine + N7-methylguanine527 in 16S rRNA

The enzyme specifically methylates guanine527 at N7 in 16S rRNA.

References

External links 
 

EC 2.1.1